Pildiküla is a small village in Rae Parish, Harju County, in northern Estonia. It has a population of 78 (as of 1 January 2010).

References

Villages in Harju County